The 12th congressional district of Illinois is a congressional district in the southern part of U.S. state of Illinois. It has been represented by Republican Mike Bost since 2015.

Geographic boundaries

2011 redistricting
The district covers parts of Madison county, and all of Alexander, Franklin, Jackson, Jefferson, Monroe, Perry, Pulaski, Randolph, St. Clair, Union and Williamson counties, as of the 2011 redistricting which followed the 2010 census. All or parts of Belleville, Cahokia, Carbondale, Collinsville, East St. Louis, Granite City, Herrin, Marion, Mt. Vernon, O'Fallon, Shiloh and Swansea are included. The representatives for these districts were elected in the 2012 primary and general elections, and the boundaries became effective on January 5, 2013.

2021 redistricting

Following the 2020 redistricting, this district will go from covering southeastern Illinois to encompassing the entirety of Southern Illinois, spanning the Illinois-Missouri-Kentucky-Indiana border. It will take in Monroe, Randolph, Clinton, Perry, Jackson, Union, Alexander, Pulaski, Massac, Johnson, Williamson, Jefferson, Marion, Clay, Effingham, Wayne, Hamilton, Saline, Pope, Hardin, Gallatin, White, Edwards, Wabash, Richland, Lawrence, Jasper, Crawford, Cumberland, and Clark Counties, most of St. Clair County, and half of Coles County.

St. Clair County is split between this district and the 13th district. They are partitioned by a Conrail line, Tanglewood Parkway, Donner Ridge, Hollywood Heights Rd, Oliver St, CSX Transportation Line, S Oak St, W 5th St, S Lincoln Ave, E US Highway 50, County Rd 218, Old O'Fallon Rd, Frank Scott Parkway E, N Green Mount Rd, S Green Mount Rd, Park Rd, S 59th St, Old St. Louis Rd, Illinois Highway 15, Rolling Acres Ln, Excellence Dr, Powdermill Creek, Cemetery Rd, and Illinois Highway 50. The 12th district takes in the municipalities of Mascoutah, Lebanon, New Athens, Marissa, Millstadt, Smithton, and Freeburg; most of Shiloh; and half of O'Fallon.

Coles County is split between this district and the 15th district. They are partitioned by West St, North County Rd 1800 East, Lincoln Prairie Grass Trail, 18th St, County Rd 1600 East, County Rd 400 North, County Rd 1240 East, Illinois Route 16, Dettro Dr, 700 North Rd, Old Fellow Rd, and the Kickapoo Creek. The 12th district takes in the municipalities of Ashmore, Oakland, and Lerna; part of southern Mattoon; and part of Charleston.

Voting

List of members representing the district

Elections

2012

2014

2016

2018

2020

2022

See also
Illinois's congressional districts
List of United States congressional districts

References

Sources

 Congressional Biographical Directory of the United States 1774–present, bioguide.congress.gov; accessed November 10, 2016.

External links
Washington Post page on the 12th District of Illinois
U.S. Census Bureau - 5th District Fact Sheet

12
Alexander County, Illinois
Constituencies established in 1863
1863 establishments in Illinois